Sebertak is a small town in Bera District, Pahang, Malaysia.

Bera District
Towns in Pahang